The 2011–12 season is Scunthorpe United F.C.'s first in League One since being relegated last season from the Championship.

Season review

Pre-season
Scunthorpe began their pre-season campaign against non-league Bottesford Town, who they beat 7–0, the Irons first goal came courtesy of trialist Mustafa Tiryaki, and with Matt Godden and Chris Dagnall putting them up 3–0 within the first half. Four more goals came in the second half from Robert Grant, Paul Reid, Mark Duffy and new signing Jordan Robertson.

League One

Standings

Results summary

Result round by round

FA Cup

League Cup

Squad

Statistics

|-
|colspan="14"|Players featured for club who have left:

|}

Goalscoring record

Disciplinary record

Suspensions served

Transfers

In

Notes1£55,000 must be paid immediately, £25,000 to be paid if Scunthorpe are promoted in the next two years and appearances related fees, means that Accrington Stanley will receive up to £195,000.

Loans In

Out

Loans Out

Fixtures and results

Pre-season

League One

FA Cup

League Cup

League Trophy

Overall summary

Summary

Score overview

References

2011-12
2011–12 Football League One by team